The 1st Legislative Assembly of Saskatchewan was elected in the Saskatchewan general election held in December 1905, the first general election for the new province. The assembly sat from March 29, 1906, to July 20, 1908. The Liberal Party led by Walter Scott formed the government. The Provincial Rights Party led by Frederick Haultain formed the official opposition.

James Trimble served as speaker for the assembly.

Members of the Assembly 
The following members were elected to the assembly in 1905:

Notes:

Party Standings 

Notes:

By-elections 
By-elections were held to replace members for various reasons:

Notes:

References 

Terms of the Saskatchewan Legislature